Jiuding Shan is a mountain in Sichuan, China. It is located in the Daxue Mountains, part of a complicated system of mountain ranges of western Sichuan, which itself is adjacent to the eastern edge of the Tibetan Plateau. By measure of topographic prominence, it is ranked 125th in the world.

See also
 List of Ultras of Tibet and East Asia

References

External links
 "Jiuding Shan, China" on Peakbagger

Mountains of Sichuan